The IBM 402 and IBM 403 Accounting Machines were tabulating machines introduced by International Business Machines in the late 1940s.

Overview
The 402 could read punched cards at a speed of 80 to 150 cards per minute, depending on process options, while printing data at a speed of up to 100 lines per minute. The built-in line printer used 43 alpha-numerical type bars (left-side) and 45 numerical type bars (right-side, shorter bars) to print a total of 88 positions across a line of a report.

The IBM 403 added the ability to print up to three lines, such as a multiline shipping address, from a single punchcard, instead of just one line per card with the 402.

The 402 and 403 were primarily controlled by a removable control panel. Additional controls included a carriage control tape and mechanical levers called hammersplits and hammerlocks, that controlled some printing functions.

In July 2010, a group from the Computer History Museum reported that an IBM 402  was still in operation at Sparkler Filters, Inc., a manufacturing company that produces chemical filtration systems, in Conroe, Texas, still as of 2022 the company's accounting and payroll is done on the oldest American computer in service within the United States of America or elsewhere on the Earth.

See also
IBM 407
IBM 711
Keypunch

References

External links
 IBM History: 402 developed in 1948 or 1949
 The IBM 402 at Columbia University
 Some IBM 402 pictures from Paul Pierce's Computer Collection
 Annotated (labeled) photograph of an IBM 402, from its manual
 Company that still uses IBM 402 

402